Raïs Hamidou may refer to:

 Raïs Hamidou, an Algerian privateer
 Raïs Hamidou, Algeria, a commune in Algeria

Arabic-language surnames